Moneo, sometimes branded as mon€o, is an electronic purse system available on French bank cards to allow small purchases to be made without cash and used from 1999 to 2015.

The system is aimed at small retailers such as bakeries and cafés and intended for purchases of less than €30.

The card is inserted into a handheld Moneo reader by the merchant who enters the transaction amount for the customer. The customer then confirms the purchase by pushing a button on the keypad; the exact amount is debited from the card within a few seconds.

As well as the multipurpose bank card version, anonymous cards (also smart cards) are available for the use of people without bank accounts, such as children and tourists.

Supported by all French banks, Moneo was tested in Brittany and Montpellier in 2002, and from 2004 Moneo has been added to most French bank cards.

See also
 Internet currency
 Octopus card
 Quick Wertkarte

External links
 The official Moneo site

Banking in France
Smart cards
Payment systems